Anisophyllea disticha is a plant of tropical Asia in the family Anisophylleaceae. The specific epithet  is from the Latin meaning "2-ranked", referring to the leaf arrangement.

Description
Its bark is smooth.

Distribution and habitat
Anisophyllea disticha grows naturally in Sumatra, Peninsular Malaysia and Borneo. Its habitat is forests from sea-level to  altitude.

References

disticha
Flora of Sumatra
Flora of Peninsular Malaysia
Flora of Borneo
Taxonomy articles created by Polbot
Taxa named by Henri Ernest Baillon
Taxa named by William Jack (botanist)